Felipe Fernández-Armesto (born 1950) is a British professor of history and author of several popular works, notably on cultural and environmental history.

Life and career
He was born in London; his father was the Spanish journalist Felipe Fernández Armesto and his mother was Betty Millan de Fernandez-Armesto, a British-born journalist and co-founder and editor of The Diplomatist, the in-house journal of the diplomatic corps in London.

Felipe Fernandez-Armesto joined the history department at the University of Notre Dame in 2009, after occupying chairs at Tufts University and at Queen Mary College, University of London. He had spent most of his career teaching at Oxford, where he was an undergraduate and doctoral student. He has had visiting appointments at many universities and research institutes in Europe and the Americas and has honorary doctorates from La Trobe University and the University of the Andes, Colombia. He began his teaching career at Charterhouse School in Godalming, Surrey.

In 1982 he published The Canary Islands after the Conquest: The Making of a Colonial Society in the Early Sixteenth Century, an archival study of the Canary Islands during the period of their original settlement. In 1987 he published Before Columbus: Exploration and Colonization from the Mediterranean to the Atlantic 1229–1492, a study of the earliest phase of European imperialism when Europeans left the Mediterranean and colonized the islands along the northwest coast of Africa.

Fernández-Armesto gained media attention in 2007 for his alleged brutalisation by five policemen in Atlanta, Georgia, following an incident of jaywalking.

Awards and honours
Among other distinctions, Fernández-Armesto has won the John Carter Brown Medal, the Caird Medal of the National Maritime Museum (UK), the Premio Nacional an Investigacion of the Sociedad Geográfica Española, Spain's Premio Nacional de Gastronomia for his history of food, and the Tercentenary Medal of the Society of Antiquaries of London.

2017: Grand Cross of the Civil Order of Alfonso X, "Spain's highest honour for contributors to science, scholarship, education, and the arts"
2008: Universidad de los Andes, honorary doctorate
2007: World History Association Book Prize, Pathfinders: A Global History of Exploration

Selected works
 Ferdinand and Isabella (1975)
 The Canary Islands after the Conquest (1982)
 Before Columbus: Exploration and Colonization from the Mediterranean to the Atlantic 1229–1492 (1987)
 The Spanish Armada (1990)
 Columbus (1991)
 Barcelona (1991)
 Millennium: A History of Our Last Thousand Years (1995)
 Reformation: Christianity & the World 1500 – 2000 (1996) (co-authored with Derek Wilson)
 Truth: A History and a Guide for the Perplexed (1997)
 Civilizations (2000).
 Food: A History (published as "Near a Thousand Tables" in US/Can) (2001).
 The Americas: A Hemispheric History (2003) 
 Ideas That Changed the World (2003).
 Humankind: A Brief History  (2004).
 Pathfinders: A Global History of Exploration (2006)  
 The World: A Brief History (2007)
 Amerigo: The Man Who Gave His Name to America (2007)
 1492. The Year the World Began (2009)
 Our America: A Hispanic History of the United States (2014)
A Foot in the River: Why Our Lives Change–and the Limits of Evolution (2015), Oxford University Press.
The Oxford Illustrated History of the World (2019), Oxford University Press.
Out of Our Minds: What We Think and How We Came to Think It (2019), Oneworld.
Straits: Beyond the Myth of Magellan (2022), Bloomsbury.

As editor
 A History of England (1997–2002)
 The Times guide to the peoples of Europe (1994)

References

External links
 Biography at Springerlink
 An interview with TMCQ: "With my usual intellectual perversity, I thought it would be interesting to have a Human history written from an imaginary perspective. I am interested in shifting perspective. I do believe in objective historical reality. I do believe that the truth is out there and I’m absolutely not a relativist or a postmodernist."
 An interview with Spiked magazine: "I defend people's right to deny the Holocaust and to utter lies — so long as the rest of us remain aware that what they're saying is a lie."
 Truth and Authenticity Pulse Berlin
 

1950 births
Living people
Writers from London
Academics of Queen Mary University of London
English historians
Historians of Spain
Tufts University faculty
English people of Spanish descent
Victims of police brutality
Alumni of Magdalen College, Oxford
Stateless nationalism in Europe
Recipients of the Civil Order of Alfonso X, the Wise